Carnegiella is a genus of freshwater hatchetfishes found in the Amazon and Orinoco basins in South America.  This genus contains some popular aquarium fishes.

Species
There are currently four recognized species in this genus:
 Carnegiella marthae G. S. Myers, 1927 (Blackwing hatchetfish)
 Carnegiella myersi Fernández-Yépez, 1950 (Pygmy hatchetfish)
 Carnegiella schereri Fernández-Yépez, 1950 (Dwarf hatchetfish)
 Carnegiella strigata (Günther, 1864) (Marbled hatchetfish)

References

Gasteropelecidae
Fish of South America